Ben Vuirich (903 m) is a mountain in the Grampian Mountains of Scotland. It is located in Perthshire, north of the town of Pitlochry.

A mountain of heather and bog, it rises to the southeast of Beinn a' Ghlò.

References

Mountains and hills of Perth and Kinross
Marilyns of Scotland
Corbetts